Mark John McNeil (born 3 December 1962) is an English former professional footballer who played in the Football League as a midfielder.

References
General
 . Retrieved 5 November 2013.
Specific

1962 births
Living people
Footballers from Bethnal Green
English footballers
Association football defenders
Aldershot F.C. players
Leyton Orient F.C. players
English Football League players